Herbitzheim is a commune in the Bas-Rhin department in Grand Est in north-eastern France.

Herbitzheim is one of 45 member communes of the Communauté de communes de l'Alsace Bossue.

Location
The village is located in the north west of Alsace, on the Canal de la Sarre at the point where the little river Eichel flows into the Saar.

Surrounding communes are Siltzheim to the north, Oermingen in the south-east and Keskastel to the south.   To the west the commune is on the border with Sarreguemines in the adjacent Moselle département.

Notable people

 Thomas Voeckler, cyclist, grew up in Herbitzheim

See also
 Communes of the Bas-Rhin department

References

Communes of Bas-Rhin
Bas-Rhin communes articles needing translation from French Wikipedia